Peachtree Center is an underground train station on the Red and Gold lines of the Metropolitan Atlanta Rapid Transit Authority (MARTA) rail system. It serves the Peachtree Center neighborhood of downtown Atlanta, and is the first station north-northeast of the rail system hub at Five Points. Peachtree Center is one of the busiest stations on the Red/Gold Lines, handling over 15,000 people per weekday.

Station layout

Interior Design 

The station has an island platform serving two tracks. The floor is made of gray tile, the "walls" are made of solid gneiss rock, and the ceiling panels are made of steel. The Ellis Street entrance was closed for more than two years for renovation; it re-opened on August 24, 2012. The Harris Street (northwest) entrance has a map of the MARTA system with proposed lines on it.

In Popular Culture 
The station was featured in the 1985 movie The Heavenly Kid.

Nearby landmarks and popular destinations
Peachtree Center/Peachtree Center Business District
 Mall at Peachtree Center
Truist Plaza
AmericasMart
Central Library
Atlanta Streetcar
Hard Rock Cafe
American Cancer Society Center (formerly Inforum)
Georgia Aquarium
World of Coca-Cola
Centennial Olympic Park
Center for Civil and Human Rights
Mercedes Benz Stadium
State Farm Arena
CNN Center
Georgia World Congress Center
College Football Hall of Fame
Woodruff Park
Westin Peachtree Plaza Hotel
Atlanta Marriott Marquis Hotel
SAE Institute
Children's Museum of Atlanta
Rialto Center for the Arts
 Various downtown Atlanta hotels

Bus routes
The station is served by the following MARTA bus routes:
 Route 40 - Downtown / Peachtree Street

Connection to other transit systems
Atlanta Streetcar
CobbLinc
Ride Gwinnett
Georgia Regional Transportation Authority

Construction
Although the operation of the North Line began between the Garnett and North Avenue stations on December 4, 1981, the Peachtree Center station between them did not open until September 11, 1982. A poster dating to 1982 on the station platform describes how the station was built.  The poster reads:

MARTA's moving Atlanta, 120 feet below Peachtree Street.

The Peachtree Center station was built by tunneling through solid gneiss, a granite like rock formed of layers of quartz and mica. This rock provides underground support for the station. Soft ground or mixed tunneling was used where there was insufficient rock structure for underground support. With this method, compressed air twice the normal atmospheric pressure was used to support the walls while permanent structures were being built. Like deep sea divers, workers on this section of the rapid rail transit system were required to undergo 30 minutes of compression/decompression when entering or coming out of the tunnel. This station is only one of a few tunnels in the world where the walls and the ceiling were carved from solid rock.

Length of longest escalator serving the station entrance across from the Atlanta Public Library is 190 feet- the longest in the southeast. Cost of Station: approx. $45 million. Station depth: 120 feet. Station length: 900 feet.

An exploratory tunnel was initially driven at the crown of the tunnel to provide input into rock quality. This gave the designer excellent information to finish the design. The cavern was constructed using a heading and bench approach, first excavating the heading and following with the bench excavation. All excavation on the cavern was accomplished using drill and blast methods. Vibration monitoring stations were established in buildings along Peachtree Street to monitor the vibrations and compare to contract limits.

The location the station was built on was originally the home to "The House That Jack Built", an eccentric commercial building built by Jasper Newton "Jack" Smith in the late 1800s. As part of a lease agreement Smith made with later leaseholders of the property, two inscribed marble slabs were to be displayed prominently in any future building constructed on the site. When Peachtree Center station opened in 1982, these two marble slabs were relocated to a fenced-off area near the subway station entrance.

References

External links

MARTA Station Page
nycsubway.org Atlanta page
 Carnegie Way entrance from Google Maps Street View

Gold Line (MARTA)
Red Line (MARTA)
Metropolitan Atlanta Rapid Transit Authority stations
Railway stations in the United States opened in 1982
Railway stations in Atlanta
1982 establishments in Georgia (U.S. state)